

Encounter Bay is a locality in the Australian state of South Australia located about  south of the state capital of Adelaide and about  south-west of the municipal seat of Victor Harbor.

It consists of land at the western end of Encounter Bay partly overlooking the subsidiary bay of Rosetta Harbor and which includes the headland of Rosetta Head (commonly known as The Bluff).   State Route B37 passes through the locality under the names of Waitpinga Road and Bay Road, and forms part of the locality's boundary to the north-west.

Encounter Bay's boundaries were created on 9 September 1993 for the "local established name".

Land use is mainly residential with some land adjoining the suburb of Victor Harbor in the north-east being zoned for "light industry" and land at the locality's southern extremity being zoned for "primary industry".  Rosetta Head which is located within the latter area is also listed as a state heritage place on the South Australian Heritage Register.

The 2016 Australian census which was conducted in August 2016 reports that Encounter Bay had a population of 4901.

Encounter Bay is located within the federal division of Mayo, the state electoral district of Finniss and the local government area of the City of Victor Harbor.

References

Towns in South Australia

Fleurieu Peninsula